Kevin Cordes (born August 13, 1993) is an American competitive swimmer who specializes in breaststroke events. He currently represents the Cali Condors which is part of the International Swimming League. Cordes was a member of the 2016 U.S. Men's Olympic Swimming Team. He won gold in the  medley relay as a member of the preliminary relay, and took 4th place in the Men's 100m Breaststroke at the 2016 Olympic Games. He is the former American record holder in the 50-meter and 100-meter breaststroke (long course).

Early life and education
Cordes was born in Naperville, Illinois in 1993, the son of Bill and Kristin Cordes. He is a 2011 graduate of Neuqua Valley High School and he graduated from the University of Arizona, where he was majoring in physiology. Swimming for the Arizona Wildcats, he was a six-time NCAA individual national champion, winning the 100-yard breaststroke four years in a row and the 200-yard breaststroke in 2013 and 2014. Cordes was the 2013 and 2014 NCAA Swimmer of the Year.

Career

2012
At the 2012 United States Olympic Trials, Cordes missed qualifying for the Olympic team, finishing third in the 100-meter breaststroke (1:00.58) and twelfth in the 200-meter breaststroke (2:13.26).

At the 2012 FINA Istanbul Short Course World Championships, his first major international competition, Cordes won a team gold medal and an individual bronze medal. The gold medal came his way in the  medley relay, swimming the breaststroke leg in 57.15 (the fastest in the field). In the 100 m breaststroke, Cordes won a bronze medal with a time of 57.83.

2013
At the 2013 U.S. Summer Nationals, Cordes finished first in the 100- and 200-meter breaststroke, and finished second behind University of Arizona teammate Kevin Steel in the 50-meter breaststroke. Cordes qualified to compete in the individual 50-, 100- and 200-meter breaststroke, and the 4×100-meter medley relay at the 2013 World Aquatics Championships.

At the 2013 World Aquatics Championships, Cordes competed in three individual events and the 4x100-meter medley relay. In his first event, the 100-meter breaststroke, Cordes got a personal best time of 59.78 in the semifinal. In the finals however, he faded away and touched 7th with a time of 1:00.02. In the 50-meter breaststroke, Cordes did not advance past the prelims, posting a time of 27.69 and finishing 21st overall. In his final individual event, the 200-meter breaststroke, Cordes did not advance past the semifinals, finishing with a time of 2:10.03. In the 4x100-meter medley relay, Cordes, as the breaststroke leg, was responsible for disqualifying the United States by diving 0.04 of a second early.

2014
At the 2014 Pan Pacific Swimming Championships, Cordes won gold as a member of the 4x100-meter medley relay with the team finishing with a time of 3:29.94. Swimming the breaststroke leg, Cordes recorded a split of 58.64. In the 100-meter breaststroke, Cordes was disqualified for taking off his goggles midway through the race after they filled with water. In the 200-meter breaststroke, Cordes scratched from the final after posting a time of 2:10.01 in the heats in order to concentrate on the medley relay.

2015
In preparation for the 2016 U.S. Olympic Trials, Cordes moved to Singapore to train with former Bolles swimming head coach, Sergio López.

2016
At the 2016 US Olympic Swimming Trials, Cordes placed first in the 100m breaststroke, qualifying him for the Olympic Team. Subsequently, at the 2016 Summer Olympics, he placed 4th in the 100-meter breaststroke with a time of 59.22, and 8th in the 200-meter breaststroke with a time of 2:08.34.

Personal bests

Personal life
Cordes has two siblings, Caroline and Jack. His father Bill played football for the University of Arizona. His sister Caroline played volleyball for the University of Arizona. His brother Jack played basketball for Hillsdale College.

See also
 List of University of Arizona people
 Arizona Wildcats

References

External links

 
 
 
 
 
 Kevin Cordes – University of Arizona athlete profile at ArizonaWildcats.com
 

1993 births
Living people
American male breaststroke swimmers
Arizona Wildcats men's swimmers
Medalists at the FINA World Swimming Championships (25 m)
Sportspeople from Naperville, Illinois
Swimmers at the 2016 Summer Olympics
Swimmers at the 2019 Pan American Games
World Aquatics Championships medalists in swimming
World record holders in swimming
Olympic gold medalists for the United States in swimming
Medalists at the 2016 Summer Olympics
Pan American Games medalists in swimming
Pan American Games bronze medalists for the United States
Medalists at the 2019 Pan American Games